This lists closed, demolished or otherwise defunct railway stations, lines or branches in Adelaide and South Australia.

Adelaide suburban network

Closed stations
There are two closed stations on the passenger railway network in the city of Adelaide, South Australia that have not been demolished, both along the Belair line:
Clapham (closed 28 April 1995)
Hawthorn (closed 28 April 1995)

Demolished stations
There are several stations along current railway routes that have been closed and demolished:

Belair railway line
Keswick (closed and demolished 2013; replaced by nearby Adelaide Showground)
Mile End Goods (closed 1994)
Showground Central (seasonal-use temporary structure, used 2003–2013; replaced by Adelaide Showground)
Sleeps Hill

Flinders railway line
Clovelly Park (closed and demolished 2020; replaced by nearby relocated Tonsley)
Tonsley (original station closed and demolished 2019; relocated station opened 2020)

Gawler railway line
GMH (at the end of a spur just north of Nurlutta)
Grand Junction (closed 1859)
Islington Works (closed 2000 and demolished )
Ovingham (closed 25 December 2020, and demolished March 2022; to be relocated and rebuilt)
Tube Mills

Grange railway line
Golf Links (closed 1961)
Holdens (closed 1992)

Outer Harbor railway line
Cheltenham Racecourse siding (closed 1953)
Cheltenham Racecourse (closed 2009, demolished 2012; replaced with nearby St Clair)
Largs Jetty (closed 1908; spur at Largs traversing Jetty Road to the Largs Pier Hotel and the jetty)
Port Dock (closed 13 September 1981; some of the original platforms and the goods shed survive as part of the National Railway Museum)
Torrens Bridge (opened 1883, closed 1888)
Yerlo (closed 13 September 1981; replaced by North Haven)

Seaford railway line
Keswick (closed and demolished 2013; replaced by nearby Adelaide Showground)
Mile End Goods (closed 1994)
Showground Central (temporary structure; used 2003–2013)
South Brighton (closed 1976)

Closed railway lines (and their closed stations)
Several complete lines have been closed, with the rails removed, all of the station infrastructure removed, and some of the stations demolished:

Jubilee Exhibition Railway (closed 1925)
Serviced the Adelaide Jubilee International Exhibition, Torrens Parade Ground and original location of Adelaide Showground direct from Adelaide railway station.

Holdfast Bay railway line (closed 14 December 1929)
Thebarton
Hilton
Richmond
Kurralta Park
Plympton Coursing Ground (closed c.1925)
Plympton
Morphettville
Camden
Novar Gardens
Macdonalds
Golf Links (closed by 1929)
St Leonards (closed 1926)
Glenelg

St Leonards–Grange railway line

Glenelg railway line (closed 1929 and converted to Glenelg tram line)
Victoria Square (closed 1914)
South Terrace
Wayville
Goodwood Road
Forestville
Black Forest
Hayhurst
South Plympton
Morphettville
Helmsdale
Miller's Corner
Glenelg

Closed branch lines

Branches from Adelaide-Wolseley railway line
Mount Pleasant railway line (closed 1964, now Amy Gillett Bikeway)
Branched from the Adelaide-Wolseley line at Balhannah.
Oakbank
Mappinga
Riverview
Woodside
Kayannie
Charleston
Muralappie
Mount Torrens
Milkappa
Birdwood
Crane Road
Narcoonah
Mount Pleasant

Branches from Belair railway line
Clapham (closed 1917)
Branched from the Belair line at Mitcham.
Clapham (original)

Branches from Gawler railway line
Northfield (closed 1987)
Branched from the Gawler line at Dry Creek.
 Cavan (closed 1987)
 Pooraka (closed 1987)
 Northfield (closed 1987)
 Stockade (closed 1961)

Penfield (closed 1991)
Branched from the Gawler line at Salisbury.
Hilra
Penfield 1
Penfield 2
Penfield 3

Branches from Grange railway line
Henley Beach railway line (opened 5 February 1894, closed 31 August 1957)
An extension of Grange railway line.
Kirkcaldy
Marlborough Street
Henley Beach

Hendon railway line (closed 1 February 1980)
Branched from the Grange line at Albert Park station.
Hendon

Branches from Outer Harbor railway line
Semaphore railway line (closed 29 October 1978)
Branched from the Outer Harbor line at Glanville station, traversing Jetty Road to the pier / jetty.
Exeter
Semaphore

Finsbury railway line (closed 17 August 1979)
Branched from the Outer Harbor line starting Woodville station.
Actil (closed 1970)
Woodville North (closed 1979)
No. 18 Shed (closed 1979)
Finsbury Stores (closed 1979)

Branches from Seaford railway line
Willunga railway line (closed 1969, now Coast to Vines Rail Trail)
Original route alignment beyond Hallett Cove.
Patpa
Happy Valley
Reynella
Pimpala
Coorara
Morphett Vale
Yetto
Hackham
Korro
Noarlunga
Moana
Tuni
McLaren Vale
Pikkara
Taringa
Willunga

Existing freight lines
Lines where passenger trains have been withdrawn, but still open for freight:
ICI Osborne (closed to passengers 1980)
Coal Gantry
Electric Works
ICI
Dry Creek-Port Adelaide (closed to passengers 27 May 1988)
Wingfield (closed 29 May 1987)
North Arm Road (closed 29 May 1987)
Eastern Parade (closed 29 May 1987)
Rosewater Loop (closed to freight 2008)
Grand Junction Road (closed 27 May 1988)
Rosewater (closed 27 May 1988)
Birkenhead Loop (closed to freight 2008)
Bridgewater, extension of Belair line (includes stations between Bridgewater and Tailem Bend) (closed to passengers 1987 and converted to standard gauge 1995)
National Park
Long Gully
Nalawort
Upper Sturt
Mount Lofty
Heathfield
Madurta
Aldgate
Jibilla
Carripook
Bridgewater
Yantaringa
Ambleside
Balhannah
Mount Barker Junction (to the east was the junction with the Victor Harbor railway line)
Nairne
Petwood
Callington
Monarto South
Tailem Bend
Port Pirie, branch from the Gawler line at Salisbury (closed 1982 when converted to standard gauge - refer Adelaide-Port Augusta)
Direk, the name is derived from "the native word for swamp"
Bolivar
Virginia
Two Wells
Mallala
Long Plains
Bowmans
Snowtown
Redhill
Merriton
Port Pirie Junction
Port Pirie (Mary Elie Street)
Port Pirie (Ellen Street)

Closed intrastate lines 
Country railway lines that are no longer used and/or have been dismantled:
Barossa, branched from Gawler railway station, closed to passengers 16 December 1968 beyond North Gawler railway station; freight continued until 2014; North Gawler is now Gawler Central in the metropolitan network
Sandy Creek
Lyndoch
Rowland Flat
Tanunda
Nuriootpa
Angaston
Gladstone, branch of Terowie line from Hamley Bridge railway station
Owen
Balaklava
Halbury
Hoyleton
Blyth
Hart
Brinkworth
Boucaut
Yacka
Gulnare
Abbeville
Georgetown
Spalding, branch of Terowie line from Riverton (closed 1983)
Rhynie
Undalya
Auburn
Watervale
Penwortham
Sevenhill
Clare
Barinia
Andrews
Spalding
Morgan, extension from Gawler (cut back to Eudunda in 1969, to Kapunda in 1995)
Roseworthy
Freeling
Fords
Kapunda
Bagot Well
Hansborough
Hampden
Eudunda
Sutherlands
Bower
Mount Mary
Eba
Morgan
Mount Gambier, branch of Adelaide-Wolseley line (closed to passengers 1990)
Frances
Naracoorte
Penola
Mount Gambier (repurposed as a park in 2015)
Robertstown, branch of Morgan line from Eudunda
Point Pass
Robertstown
Truro, branch of Barossa Valley line from Nuriootpa
Stockwell
Truro
Terowie, branch from Roseworthy (closed 1980s)
Roseworthy
Wasleys
Hamley Bridge
Tarlee
Riverton
Saddleworth
Manoora
Merildin
Farrell Flat
Hanson
Burra
Mount Bryan
Hallett
Whyte Yarcowie
Terowie
Gumbowie
Whyalla, branch of Adelaide-Darwin railway from Port Augusta (closed 31 December 1990)
Whyalla
Wilmington, narrow-gauge branch from Gladstone
Laura
Stone Hut
Wirrabara
Yandiah
Booleroo Centre
Perroomba
Melrose
Terka
Wilmington

See also

List of Adelaide railway stations
List of suburban and commuter rail systems
TransAdelaide
Railways in Adelaide
South Australian Railways
Rail transport in South Australia

References

Rails Through Swamp and Sand – A History of the Port Adelaide Railway.  M. Thompson pub. Port Dock Station Railway Museum (1988)  
Andrews FB. "The Salisbury munitions tramways." In Light railways, 187. February 2006.
Anon. The bay line. SASTA, Adelaide. 1979
Barry PJ. "The Jubilee Exhibition Railway" In ARHS bulletin 732. October, 1998.
Callaghan WH. The overland railway. ARHS NSW, St James. 1992.
Castle BJ. "The Balhannah – Mount Pleasant branch line." ARHS bulletin 316, February, 1964.
Collins N. The jetties of South Australia. Privately published, Woodside. 2005.
Fluck RE, R Sampson and KJ Bird. Steam locomotives and railcars of the South Australian Railways. Mile End Railway Museum, Roseworthy. 1986.
Jennings R. Line clear: 100 years of train working Adelaide-Serviceton. Mile End Railway Museum, Roseworthy. 1986.
Lockyer A. "Jetty and wharf tramways of South Australia". In Light railways, 142. August, 1998.
Mack D. Little coastal railways of the Adelaide plains. Privately published, Camden Park. 1986.
McNicol S. SAR railcars. Railmac, Elizabeth. 1989.
Pantlin G and J Sargent (eds). Railway stations in greater metropolitan Adelaide. Train Hobby, Melbourne. 2005.
Richardson J.(ed) Along the line no. 2. Traction, Canberra City. 1964.
Richardson J.(ed) Along the line in South Australia. Traction, Canberra City. 1964
Sampson R. Rails round Adelaide. Mile End Railway Museum, Walkerville. 1978.
Thompson MH. "The Goodwood – Brighton – Willunga line." ARHS bulletin, 336, October, 1965.
Wheaton RT. Rails to the bay. Australian Electric Traction Assoc. Sydney, 1971.

 01
Railway stations, Closed
South Australia, closed
Railway stations, Closed
Railway stations, Closed